The Numbering Plan as defined by the national regulator can be found in: Fundamental Numbering Plan.

Numbering Plan

Special Numbers
International Dial-Out Prefix: 00
Long-distance Dial-Out Prefix: 0
Fire brigade: 102
Police: 101
Ambulance: 911
Toll-free numbers: 1-700, 1-800

Calling
To call a local number from a landline-phone, dial directly the 7 digits of the subscriber (xxx-xxxx).
To make a national long-distance call, or from any mobile phone to a local or national number, dial (0a) xxx-xxxx (For example, to a number in Pichincha province, (02) 211-1111).
To call from outside the country to a landline, dial +593-a-xxx-xxxx (For example, to a number in Guayas province, +593-4-211-1111)
To call from outside the country to a mobile (cellular) phone, according to ITU Document at https://www.itu.int/dms_pub/itu-t/oth/02/02/T020200003D0001PDFE.pdf, it should look like:

References

ITU allocations list
Plan Tecnico Fundamental Numeracion (in Spanish)

Ecuador
Ecuador communications-related lists